Prussian blue or Prussian Blue may refer to:

Pigments
Prussian blue, a dark blue pigment containing iron and cyanide
Prussian blue (medical use), the use of Prussian blue for medical treatment and diagnosis
Perls' Prussian blue, a stain used for medical diagnosis

Music
Prussian Blue (album), a 1973 album by Richard Clapton
Prussian Blue (duo), a neo-Nazi white nationalist teen pop duo from California

See also
Dreams in Prussian Blue, a 2010 novel by Paritosh Uttam, adapted into the film Artist
Russian Blue, a cat breed

nl:Prussian Blue